Lençóis Paulista is a municipality in the Central West region of the state of São Paulo. The population is 68,990 (2020 est.) in an area of 810 km². The elevation is 550 m.

It is home of the largest library in the interior of the State of São Paulo, an institution of higher learning, and a SENAI technical school.

History
The city was founded on April 28, 1858. It was originally named "Lençóis", but a 1940s' decree by then Brazilian president Getúlio Vargas determined that there could be no homonymous cities in Brazil, and since there was already an older city called Lençóis (in Bahia state), the city was renamed Lençóis Paulista. The original proposal was to rename it Ubirama, but the population wanted to keep the original name.

Geography
The territory is drained by waters of the Lençóis River, which is also the source responsible for the water supply of the city. The climate is subtropical, with maximum temperatures around 38 °C between November and February, and minimum temperatures around 4 °C between June and August.

The neighboring municipalities of Lençóis Paulista are Macatuba, Pederneiras and Agudos to the north; Borebi to the west; Avaré and Botucatu to the south; and Pratânia, Areiópolis and São Manuel to the east.

Economy
The economic foundation of the city is its industry, which highlights its production of sugar, alcohol, cellulose, oil, metal structures, renewable energy and food. Its main agricultural products are sugar cane, corn, beans, and wood. The city's commerce, which for many years was subordinate to the neighboring city of Bauru, today is passing through a period of expansion with the building of the Lençóis Paulista Shopping.

The municipality has a Commercial and Industrial Association, the ACILPA, which develops work in partnership with SEBRAE, SENAI and the municipal government. It has the second highest GDP of the Administrative Region of Bauru, and has become the central hub of a commercial micro-region that includes the municipalities of Macatuba, Areiópolis, Borebi and Pederneiras. The city has a mall and an annual industrial trade fair called the FACILPA.

References

External links
  Official Website - Prefeitura Municipal de Lençóis Paulista

Municipalities in São Paulo (state)
Populated places established in 1858
1858 establishments in Brazil